#1's is the first compilation album by American singer Prince Royce; it was released on November 19, 2012, by Top Stop Music.
The album, mostly a collection of Royce's hits thus far, contains tracks from his first two studio albums, Prince Royce (2010) and Phase II (2012).

The release debuted and peaked at number three on the Billboard Top Latin Albums chart in the United States. Among the tracks included on the album are the US Latin and Tropical songs charts hit singles "Stand by Me", "Corazón Sin Cara", "Las Cosas Pequeñas", "Incondicional", and "Te Me Vas". #1's was eventually certified Platinum (Latin field) by Recording Industry Association of America (RIAA) in the US for certified units of at least 60,000. The album was later nominated for Tropical Album of the Year at the 2014 Latin Billboard Music Awards.

Review
David Jeffries of AllMusic gave the album 4 out of 5 stars saying, "With only two albums under his belt as of 2012, a year-end Prince Royce compilation might seem a bit premature, but the singer's mix of urban, bachata, and Latin pop flavours had him topping Billboard magazine's Year End Issue's Latin Charts for the second year in a row, so consider this a celebration. Those who passed on his first two full-lengths can consider it a catch-up too as #1's checks off the biggest singles from both his 2010 self-titled debut and its 2012 follow-up Phase II. With his remake of Ben E. King's "Stand by Me," his bachata blockbuster "Corazón Sin Cara," and his plush, romantic favourite "Las Cosas Pequeñas," all on the track list, the usual suspects are accounted for, while collaborative tracks with rock band Mana ("El Verdadero Amor Perdona") and salsa singer Luis Enrique ("Sabes") round out the collection well with some desirable, off-album selections. Strange that "El Amor Que Perdimos" is here, since the track "stalled" on Billboard's Latin charts somewhere in the teens, but forgive the oversight and this—mostly—chart-topping collection offers a convenient, hit-filled overview of the superstar's early work."

Track listing

Charts

Weekly charts

Year-end charts

Certification

References

2012 greatest hits albums
Prince Royce compilation albums
Spanish-language compilation albums
Top Stop Music compilation albums
Compilation albums of number-one songs